Jainism is India's sixth-largest religion and is practiced throughout India. Per the 2011 census, there are 4,451,753 Jains in the 1.35 billion population of India, the majority living in Maharashtra, Rajasthan, Gujarat and Madhya Pradesh, Karnataka, however, the influence of Jainism has been far greater on the Indian population than these numbers suggest. Jains can be found in every states and union territories, varying from large societies to smaller. The state of Jharkhand, with a population of 16,301 Jains also contains the holy pilgrimage centre of Sammed Shikharji. Jains can be found throughout India and in many other countries throughout the world.

History

Jain doctrine teaches that Jainism has always existed and will always exist, Like most ancient Indian religions, Jainism has its roots from the Indus Valley civilization, reflecting native spirituality prior to the Indo-Aryan migration into India. Other scholars suggested the Shramana traditions were separate and contemporaneous with Indo-Aryan religious practices of the historical Vedic religion. In August 2005, the Supreme Court of India ruled that Jainism, Sikhism (and Buddhism) are distinct religions, but are inter-connected and inter-related to Hinduism, so these three are part of wider broader Hindu religion, based on the historic background on how the Constitution had come into existence after. However, in the 2006 verdict, Supreme Court of India found that the "Jain Religion is indisputably not a part of the Hindu Religion".

As per Jainism, there are 24 tirthankaras (bhagwaan) of Jains in which first tirthankara named Vrishabhnath Ji born in Ajodhya and  salvation in Kailash Mountain. The Last tirthankara is Vardhman ( Mahaveer) was born in Kundgram( Vaishali) and take salvation in Pavapur. There are many variations in Jainism like  Digamber (Terapanthi, beespanthi), Shwetamber, Sthanak, and so forth.

Status in India
On January 20, 2014, the Government of India awarded the minority status to the Jain community in India, as per Section 2(c) of the National Commission for Minorities (NCM) Act (NCM), 1992. This made the Jain community which makes for 9.5 million or 0.72 percent of the population as per 2011 census, the sixth community to be designated this status as a "national minority", after Muslims, Christians, Sikhs, Buddhists and Parsis. Though Jains already had minority status in 11 states of India including Uttar Pradesh, Madhya Pradesh, Chhattisgarh and Rajasthan, in 2005 a petition was filed with Supreme Court of India, by community representatives, which was also backed by the National Minorities Commission. In its judgement the court left the decision to the Central government.

Jainism by state
Jainism as a religion exists throughout India. Jainism also varies from state to state, but the core values are the same.
 Jainism in Assam
 Jainism in Bengal
 Jainism in Bihar
 Jainism in Bundelkhand
 Jainism in Delhi
 Jainism in Gujarat (Gujarati Jain)
 Jainism in Rajasthan (Marwari Jain)
 Jainism in Karnataka (Kannada Jain)
 Jainism in Kerala
 Jainism in Maharashtra (Marathi Jain)
 Jainism in Mumbai
 Jainism in Nagaland
 Jainism in North Karnataka
 Jainism in Tamil Nadu (Tamil Jain)
 Jainism in Tulu Nadu (Jain Bunt)
 Jainism in Uttar Pradesh

Census of India, 2011

See also

List of Jain temples

Notes

References
 
 
Elst, K. (2002). Who is a Hindu?: Hindu revivalist views of Animism, Buddhism, Sikhism, and other offshoots of Hinduism. 

 
Jain communities